Fredrik Eriksson (born July 18, 1983) is a Swedish professional ice hockey defenceman, who is currently playing for Borås HC in the HockeyEttan (Div.1).

Playing career
Initially a left winger, Eriksson was signed by Färjestads BK as a junior and played with the club's junior teams until 2001, also playing a few games with Färjestads' senior team. He was subsequently loaned to the Allsvenskan club, Bofors IK. He stayed with Bofors for three seasons and then returned to Färjestad in the summer of 2003.

On April 18, 2006, Färjestad won the Swedish Championship. In April 2006, he left Färjestad and signed with the Malmö Redhawks. It was with Malmö that Eriksson changed to a defence position.

On April 27, 2010, he left Sweden to sign for German club Thomas Sabo Ice Tigers of the DEL. After one season with the Ice Tigers, Eriksson returned to Sweden to link up with Frölunda HC on a two-year deal.

On April 27, 2013, Eriksson signed for a second stint with the Thomas Sabo Ice Tigers in Germany. In the 2013–14 season, Eriksson assumed a top-pairing role within the Ice Tigers and responded to produce his best season in Germany with 12 goals and 46 points in 49 games. He would lead all DEL defenseman in each scoring category, to be selected as the DEL defenseman of the Year.

After two season with the Ice Tigers, Eriksson opted to join his second German side, Kölner Haie, signing as a free agent to a two-year contract on March 23, 2015. On July 9, 2018, Eriksson joined his third German club, the Straubing Tigers, after agreeing to a one-year contract as a free agent.

Career statistics

Regular season and playoffs

International

Inline career

Eriksson was a member of the Sweden national men's inline hockey team that competed at the 2008 Men's World Inline Hockey Championships in Bratislava.

References

External links

1983 births
Living people
Bofors IK players
Borås HC players
Färjestad BK players
Frölunda HC players
EC KAC players
Kölner Haie players
Malmö Redhawks players
Straubing Tigers players
Swedish ice hockey defencemen
Swedish expatriate ice hockey players in Germany
Thomas Sabo Ice Tigers players
Sportspeople from Örebro